Richard Fleming George Charles Grey, 6th Earl Grey (4 March 1939 – 10 September 2013) was a British hereditary peer.

Early life and education
Richard Grey was the son of Albert Grey and Vera Harding.  Through his father, he was a great-great-grandson of Charles Grey, 2nd Earl Grey.

Richard Grey was educated at Hounslow College and Hammersmith College of Art and Building, training as a quantity surveyor.

Career
In 1963, he succeeded as Earl Grey, following the death of Charles Grey, 5th Earl Grey, his second cousin twice removed, although he did not inherit the family seat of Howick Hall.

From 1976, he became a full-time member of the House of Lords, taking the Liberal Party whip. He was the Liberal Party's spokesman on social services and disability issues. He also served as secretary to the House of Lords small business group from 1980 to 1984.

He was an official observer of elections across Africa, including the 1980 election in Rhodesia.

He was chairman of the London Cremation Company, based in Golders Green, and served as president of the Cremation Society of Great Britain from 1992 until his death.

He died on 10 September 2013, aged 74. His funeral was held at Golders Green Crematorium on 15 October 2013.

He was succeeded in the earldom by his younger brother, Philip Kent Grey, 7th Earl Grey, who was born 11 May 1940.

Personal life
Earl Grey married twice.

He married Margaret Ann Bradford, daughter of Henry G. Bradford of Ashburton, Devon in 1966; they divorced in 1974. Later the same year on 17 August 1974 he married Stephanie Caroline, former widow of Surgeon-Commander Neil Lancaster Denham, RN, and only daughter of Donald Gaskell-Brown of Newton Ferrers, Devon.

Heraldry 

Arms: Gules, a lion rampant within a bordure engrailed argent, in dexter chief point a mullet or.

Crest: A scaling ladder or, hooked and pointed sable.

Supporters: Dexter, a lion rampant purpure, ducally crowned or, sinister, a tiger guarded purpure.

Motto: De bon vouloir servir le roy

Creations: Baronetcy (GB) 11 Jan 1745/6, Baron (UK), 23 June 1801, Earl and Viscount (UK), 11 April 1806.

Legal issues 

In 1983, Grey, along with four other men, was remanded on bail after being accused of jointly living off the earnings of prostitution.

See also
 Earl Grey

References

Bibliography

External links

Earls Grey
1939 births
2013 deaths
Liberal Democrats (UK) hereditary peers
Grey